Mongu Airport  is an airport serving Mongu, the capital city of Western Province, Zambia.

Facilities

See also
Transport in Zambia
List of airports in Zambia

References

External links
OpenStreetMap - Mongu
SkyVector - Mongu Airport

Airports in Zambia
Buildings and structures in Western Province, Zambia